Azeta schausi is a species of moth in the family Erebidae first described by William Barnes and Foster Hendrickson Benjamin in 1924. It is found in North America.

The MONA or Hodges number for Azeta schausi is 8576.

References

Further reading

 
 
 

Eulepidotinae
Articles created by Qbugbot
Moths described in 1924